Antiplanes obesus is a species of sea snail, a marine gastropod mollusk in the family Pseudomelatomidae.

Description
The length of the shell is up to 45 mm.

Distribution
This marine species occurs off Japan and the Kurile Islands, Russia.

References

 Habe, T. (1958b) Description of three new species of the genus Rectiplanes from Japan. Venus, 20, 181–186
 Hasegawa K. (2009) Upper bathyal gastropods of the Pacific coast of northern Honshu, Japan, chiefly collected by R/V Wakataka-maru. In: T. Fujita (ed.), Deep-sea fauna and pollutants off Pacific coast of northern Japan. National Museum of Nature and Science Monographs 39: 225–383.
 Hasegawa K. & Okutani T. (2011) A review of bathyal shell-bearing gastropods in Sagami Bay. Memoirs of the National Sciences Museum, Tokyo 47: 97-144. [15 April 2011]

External links
 
 

obesus
Gastropods described in 1958